Palm tree usually refers to tree-like plants of the family Arecaceae:

Palm trees can grow to about 100 to 160 feet tall.
 See Arecaceae#Selected genera for lists of genera belonging to the family
 See Arecaceae#Other plants for species commonly called palms, although not true palms

Palm tree may also refer to:

Places
Palmtree, Queensland, Australia
Palm Tree, New York, U.S.

Other uses
The Palm Tree (Bow), a pub in London
"Palm Tree", a 2016 single by Chancellor

See also
Operation Dekel (Hebrew: מבצע דקל, 'Operation Palm Tree'), an Israeli offensive in 1948
Palm tree pattern, a German World War II camouflage pattern
Palmier (French, 'palm tree'), a French pastry 
Sansana (Hebrew: סַנְסַנָּה, 'palm tree'), a settlement in the West Bank